Nazeem Hussain (born 21 April 1985) is an Australian comedian, actor, television and radio presenter. He is best known as creator and star of two television comedy shows, Legally Brown (2013-14) and Orange Is the New Brown (2018). His Netflix special Nazeem Hussain: Public Frenemy began streaming worldwide in 2019. The ABC describes Hussain's comedy as having a "trademark confrontational style - tackling topics like race relations, the War on Terror and life being brown and Muslim in Australia".

Early life
Hussain was born in 1985 in Melbourne, Australia. His parents, both born in Sri Lanka, met in London before relocating to Australia in the 1970s. Following their separation when Hussain was six years old, Hussain's father returned to Sri Lanka.  Hussain's father died of COVID-19 in 2021.

Hussain has two sisters.

Hussain studied law and science at Deakin University and worked as a tax consultant for PriceWaterhouseCoopers prior to entering comedy.

Political views and activities 

Hussain has served as Treasurer and an Executive of the Islamic Council of Victoria. 

He appeared on the ABC's Q+A program in 2011 following the death of Osama Bin Laden in 2011 and characterised the "extra-judicial" shooting of the Al Qaeda leader as an example of the United States seeming to "always be outside that sphere of what's right", and said "with so many years of [Western] intervention in the Middle East, eventually you're going to create someone like Osama Bin Laden who is going to react in a way that you just can't control". He also criticised the Government's efforts to stop the people smuggling trade to Australia, and said it was a "myth" that the Howard Government had stopped people smuggling boat arrivals, because "You can't deter people smugglers."

In a 2021 ABC program entitled The School That Tried to End Racism, Hussain led a discussion with primary students. The program promoted critical race theory. Nazeem led a discussion with primary school children to present the comedy character Con the Fruiterer as racist.

The ABC describes Hussain's own comedy as being "confrontational" in dealing with race relations, and Islam. In his 2019 Melbourne International Comedy Festival Gala routine, he depicted Christians as pedophiles, Jews as controlling the media and money, and said of Catholic Cardinal George Pell "I hope you're enjoying prison bitch".

In 2022, Hussain withdrew from participating in the Festival of Sydney because the Festival accepted a $20,000 donation from the Israeli Embassy.

References

External links

Nazeem Hussain on On Line Opinion

1986 births
Living people
Australian Muslims
Australian people of Sri Lankan Tamil descent
Australian male comedians
Australian stand-up comedians
Australian comedy writers
Muslim male comedians
Australian television talk show hosts
21st-century Australian male actors
Australian radio personalities
Australian social workers
Comedians from Melbourne
Lawyers from Melbourne
Male actors from Melbourne
People educated at Melbourne High School
Deakin University alumni
RMITV alumni
I'm a Celebrity...Get Me Out of Here! (Australian TV series) participants